The Ngardok were an indigenous Australian people of the Northern Territory. Nothing is known of the language, which has been extinct since about WW2.

Country
They inhabited Field Island in Van Diemen Gulf as well as the scrub and swamplands of the adjacent continental coastal belt between the South Alligator River as far as Farewell Point near the mouth of the East Alligator River.

Alternative names
 Ngardulk
 Ngadok
 Ngadug
 Ngadulg
 Ad-dok
 Gnaruk
 A'ragu
 Bimbirik. (?)

Notes

Citations

Sources

Yolngu